Erythrolamprus aenigma, also known commonly as the savannah racer snake, is a species of snake in the family Colubridae. The species is found in  Brazil, Guyana, and Venezuela.

References

Erythrolamprus
Reptiles of Brazil
Reptiles of Guyana
Reptiles of Venezuela
Reptiles described in 2021